Nina Eisenhardt (born 28 May 1990 in Sindelfingen) is a German politician from Alliance 90/The Greens. She has been a member of the Hesse State Parliament since 2019.

Life 
Nina Eisenhardt received her Bachelor in Political Science from the Technical University of Darmstadt in 2014 and studied International Studies: Peace and Conflict Studies as a Master at the Goethe University Frankfurt from 2014 to 2017. she was the state director of the Green Youth of Hesse from 2015 to 2018.

Eisenhardt was a member of the city council in Renningen for her party from 2009 to 2010. In the 2017 German federal election, she ran as a candidate in the Groß-Gerau electoral district. In the 2018 Hessian state election she also ran as a candidate in the Groß-Gerau II electoral district, and was elected to the Hesse state parliament via the Green Party's state list. In the state parliament, she is a member of the Committee for Digital Affairs and Data Protection and the Committee for Science and the Arts.

References

External links 
 Offizielle Website
 Landtag Hessen nina-eisenhardt

1990 births
Living people
Alliance 90/The Greens politicians
Members of the Landtag of Hesse
Technische Universität Darmstadt alumni
Goethe University Frankfurt alumni
21st-century German politicians
21st-century German women politicians